Deudorix ufipa is a butterfly in the family Lycaenidae. It is found in western Tanzania and Zambia. The habitat consists of montane areas.

The larvae probably feed on the berries of Rutidea species.

References

Butterflies described in 1948
Deudorigini
Deudorix